Anatrachyntis paroditis is a moth in the family Cosmopterigidae. It was described by Edward Meyrick in 1928, and is known from the Pacific, including Fiji, south-east Asia and the Seychelles.

References

Moths described in 1928
Anatrachyntis
Moths of Asia
Moths of Oceania